The Puerto Rico Teachers Association (Spanish: Asociación de Maestros de Puerto Rico) is one of the trade unions that represents teachers in Puerto Rico. Its mission is to promote and defend the right of every person to free secular public education. It is one of the oldest organizations based in Puerto Rico, tracing back its history to 1911.

External links
 amprnet.org - official site

References

1911 establishments in Puerto Rico
Non-profit organizations based in Puerto Rico
Trade unions in Puerto Rico
Trade unions established in 1911